Obra  is a village in the administrative district of Gmina Wolsztyn, within Wolsztyn County, Greater Poland Voivodeship, in west-central Poland.

The landmark of Obra is the former Cistercian Abbey with the Baroque Church of Saint James.

References

Obra